Epitafium dla Barbary Radziwiłłówny is a Polish historical film. It was released in 1982. Directed by Janusz Majewski.

Cast 
Aleksandra Śląska as Królowa Bona
Anna Dymna as Barbara Radziwiłówna
Krzysztof Kolberger as Anonimus
Jan Machulski as Ochmistrz Wolski
Jerzy Trela as Mikołaj "Czarny" Radziwił/ brother of Barbary
Jerzy Zelnik as Zygmunt II August
Bożena Adamek as Elżbieta Habsburżanka

References

External links
 

1982 films
Polish historical films
1980s Polish-language films
1980s historical films